Parortholitha is a genus of moths in the family Geometridae erected by Claude Herbulot in 1955.

Species
Parortholitha chrysographa Herbulot, 1972
Parortholitha cubitata Herbulot, 1981
Parortholitha indocilis Herbulot, 1963
Parortholitha ingens Herbulot, 1970
Parortholitha moerdyki Herbulot, 1980
Parortholitha subrectaria Walker, 1861
Parortholitha recta Prout, 1916

References

Geometridae